Zirani is a rural locality (a selo) in Maydansky Selsoviet, Untsukulsky District, Republic of Dagestan, Russia. The population was 65 as of 2010.

Geography 
Zirani is located 21 km southeast of Shamilkala (the district's administrative centre) by road. Maydanskoye is the nearest rural locality.

References 

Rural localities in Untsukulsky District